= Cambodian SingMeng Telemedia =

Cambodian Singmeng Telemedia co., Ltd is a Cambodian provider of digital terrestrial television (DTT) and over-the-top content television (OTT TV).

SuperNet or Cambodian Supreme Telecommunication Media Group was incorporated by the China-ASEAN Fund and Chinese and Cambodian in budget US$100 million for the investment which focuses on advanced technologies of Internet and TV.

SuperNet sells Internet broadband, OTT Internet TV, mobile phone TV, and DTT wireless digital TV access services business coverage 25 provinces and various provincial capital cities in Cambodia.
